The 2018 Cleveland Indians season was the 118th season for the franchise. It was the sixth season under the leadership of manager Terry Francona and third under general manager Mike Chernoff. The Indians played all of their home games at Progressive Field in Cleveland, Ohio. This was the last season in which the Indians logo Chief Wahoo was used on uniforms or on stadium signs. They won their third straight American League Central title before being swept by the defending World Series champion Houston Astros in the 2018 American League Division Series. Due to the Indians losing to the Astros, the Indians became the 5th team in MLB history to have a 70 year title drought.

Season standings

American League Central

American League Wild Card

Record against opponents

Roster

Game log

|- style= "background:#fbb;"
| 1 || March 29 || @ Mariners || 1–2 || Hernández (1–0) || Kluber (0–1) || Díaz (1) || 47,149 || 0–1 ||L1
|- style= "background:#bfb;"
| 2 || March 31 || @ Mariners || 6–5 || Carrasco (1–0) || Paxton (0–1) || Allen (1) || 35,881 || 1–1 ||W1
|- style= "background:#fbb;"
| 3 || April 1 || @ Mariners || 4–5 || Leake (1–0) || Otero (0–1) || Díaz (2) || 24,506 || 1–2 ||L1
|- style="background:#bfb"
| 4 || April 2 || @ Angels ||  6–0 || Clevinger (1–0) || Ramírez (0–1) || — || 43,904 || 2–2 ||W1
|- style="background:#fbb"
| 5 || April 3 || @ Angels || 2–13 || Richards (1–0) || Tomlin (0–1) || — || 35,007 || 2–3 ||L1
|- style="background:#fbb;"
| 6 || April 4 || @ Angels || 2–3 (13) || Ramirez (1–1) || McAllister (0–1) || — || 32,412 || 2–4 ||L2
|- style="background:#bfb;"
| 7 || April 6 || Royals || 3–2 || Carrasco (2–0) || Duffy (0–2) || Allen (2) || 34,720 || 3–4 ||W1
|- style="background:#fbb;"
| 8 || April 7 || Royals || 0–1 || Kennedy (1–0) || Bauer (0–1) || Herrera (2) || 17,362 || 3–5 ||L1
|- style="background:#bfb;"
| 9 || April 8 || Royals || 3–1 || Allen (1–0) || Maurer (0–2) || — || 14,240 || 4–5 ||W1
|- style="background:#bfb;"
| 10 || April 9 || Tigers || 2–0 || Kluber (1–1) || Liriano (1–1) || Miller (1) || 9,843 || 5–5 ||W2
|- style="background:#bfb;"
| 11 || April 10 || Tigers || 2–1 || Miller (1–0) || Wilson (0–2) || Allen (3) || 10,078 || 6–5 ||W3
|- style="background:#bfb;"
| 12 || April 11 || Tigers || 5–1 || Carrasco (3–0) || Norris (0–1) || — || 10,872 || 7–5 ||W4
|- style="background:#bfb;"
| 13 || April 12 || Tigers || 9–3 || Bauer (1–1) || Fulmer (1–2) || — || 12,901 || 8–5 ||W5
|- style="background:#fbb;"
| 14 || April 13 || Blue Jays || 4–8 || Barnes (1–0) || McAllister (0–2) ||  — || 25,592 || 8–6 ||L1
|- style="background:#bbb;"
| — || April 14 || Blue Jays || colspan="8" | Postponed (rain). Makeup date: May 3 (Game 1).
|- style="background:#bbb;"
| — || April 15 || Blue Jays || colspan="8" | Postponed (rain). Makeup date: May 3 (Game 2).
|- style="background:#bfb;"
| 15 || April 17 || @ Twins * || 6–1 || Kluber (2–1) || Odorizzi (1–1) || — || 19,516 || 9–6 ||W1
|- style="background:#fbb;"
| 16 || April 18 || @ Twins * || 1–2 (16) || Busenitz (1–0) || Tomlin (0–2) || — || 19,537 || 9–7 ||L1
|- style="background:#fbb;"
| 17 || April 20 || @ Orioles || 1–3 || Bundy (1–2) || Bauer (1–2) || O'Day (1) || 20,004 || 9–8 ||L2
|- style="background:#bfb;"
| 18 || April 21 || @ Orioles || 4–0 || Clevinger (2–0) || Tillman (0–4) || — || 29,187 || 10–8 || W1
|- style="background:#bfb;"
| 19 || April 22 || @ Orioles || 7–3 || Kluber (3–1) || Cashner (1–3) || — || 27,394 || 11–8 ||W2
|- style="background:#bfb;"
| 20 || April 23 || @ Orioles || 2–1 || Carrasco (4–0) || Gausman (1–2)  || Allen (4) || 10,614 || 12–8 ||W3
|- style="background:#fbb;"
| 21 || April 24 || Cubs || 3–10 || Chatwood (1–3) || Tomlin (0–3) || — || 16,408 || 12–9 ||L1
|- style="background:#bfb;"
| 22 || April 25 || Cubs || 4–1 || Bauer (2–2) || Lester (2–1) || Allen (5) || 15,712 || 13–9 ||W1
|- style="background:#fbb;"
| 23 || April 26 || Mariners || 4–5 || Altavilla (2–2) || Goody (0–1) || Díaz (11) || 12,133 || 13–10 ||L1
|- style="background:#bfb;"
| 24 || April 27 || Mariners || 6–5 || Kluber (4–1) || Ramírez (0–2) || — || 16,335 || 14–10 ||W1
|- style="background:#fbb;"
| 25 || April 28 || Mariners || 4–12 || Leake (3–2) || Carrasco (4–1) || — || 19,172 || 14–11 ||L1
|- style="background:#fbb;"
| 26 || April 29 || Mariners || 4–10 || Gonzales (3–2) || Tomlin (0–4) || — || 17,878 || 14–12 ||L2
|- style="background:#bfb;"
| 27 || April 30 || Rangers || 7–5 ||  Allen (2–0) || Martin (0–1) || Beliveau (1) || 12,851 || 15–12 ||W1
|-
|colspan="10"|*April 17 and 18 games played in San Juan, Puerto Rico
|-

|- style="background:#fbb;"
| 28 || May 1 || Rangers || 6–8 (12) ||Claudio (1–1) || Goody (0–2) || — || 16,356 || 15–13 || L1
|- style="background:#bfb;"
| 29 || May 2 || Rangers || 12–4 ||  Kluber (5–1) || Moore (1–4) || — || 15,637 || 16–13 ||W1
|- style="background:#fbb;"
| 30 || May 3 || Blue Jays || 11–13 (11) || Mayza (1–0) || Olson (0–1) || — || 19,007 || 16–14 ||L1
|- style="background:#bfb;"
| 31 || May 3 || Blue Jays || 13–4 || Plutko (1–0) || Biagini (0–1) || — || 19,007 || 17–14 ||W1
|- style="background:#fbb;"
| 32 || May 4 || @ Yankees || 6–7 ||  Chapman (1–0) || Ogando (0–1) || — || 46,869 || 17–15 ||L1
|- style="background:#fbb;"
| 33 || May 5 || @ Yankees || 2–5 || Gray (2–2)  || Bauer (2–3) || Robertson (1) || 43,075 || 17–16 ||L2
|- style="background:#fbb;"
| 34 || May 6 || @ Yankees || 4–7 || Shreve (2–0) || Allen (2–1) ||— || 40,107 || 17–17 ||L3
|- style="background:#fbb;"
| 35 || May 8 || @ Brewers || 2–3 || Suter (2–2) || Kluber (5–2) || Hader (5) || 35,314 || 17–18 ||L4
|- style="background:#bfb;"
| 36 || May 9 || @ Brewers || 6–2 || Carrasco (5–1) || Guerra (2–3) || — || 26,345 || 18–18 ||W1
|- style="background:#fbb;"
| 37 || May 11 || Royals || 9–10 || Keller (1–1) ||Miller (1–1) || Herrera (8) || 24,408 || 18–19 ||L1
|- style="background:#bfb;"
| 38 || May 12 || Royals || 6–2 ||  Clevinger (3–0)
|| Junis (4–3)|| — || 24,587 || 19–19 ||W1
|- style="background:#bfb;"
| 39 || May 13 || Royals || 11–2 || Kluber (6–2) || Duffy (1–5) || — || 22,105 || 20–19 ||W2
|- style="background:#fbb;"
| 40 || May 14 || @ Tigers || 3–6 || Fiers (4–2) || Carrasco (5–2) || — || 17,775 || 20–20 ||L1
|- style="background:#fbb;"
| 41 || May 15 || @ Tigers || 8–9 || Coleman (1–0) || Miller (1–2) || Greene (9) || 20,997 || 20–21 ||L2
|- style="background:#bfb;"
| 42 || May 16 || @ Tigers || 6–0 || Bauer (3–3)  || Carpenter (0–1) || — || 24,771 || 21–21 ||W1
|- style="background:#fbb;"
| 43 || May 18 || @ Astros || 1–4 || Morton (6–0) || Clevinger (3–1) || Giles (7)  || 35,959  || 21–22 ||L1
|- style="background:#bfb;"
| 44 || May 19 || @ Astros || 5–4 || Kluber (7–2) || Keuchel (3–6) || Allen (6) || 39,926 || 22–22 ||W1
|- style="background:#fbb;"
| 45 || May 20 || @ Astros || 1–3 || McCullers Jr. (6–2) || Carrasco (5–3) || Giles (8) || 30,770 || 22–23 ||L1
|- style="background:#bfb;"
| 46 || May 22 || @ Cubs || 10–1 || Bauer (4–3) || Chatwood (3–4) || — || 37,168 || 23–23 ||W1
|- style="background:#bfb;"
| 47 || May 23 || @ Cubs || 1–0 || Plutko (2–0) || Lester (4–2) || Allen (7) || 39,004 || 24–23 ||W2
|- style="background:#fbb;"
| 48 || May 24 || Astros || 2–8 || Morton (7–0) || Clevinger (3–2) || — || 19,660 || 24–24 ||L1
|- style="background:#fbb;"
| 49 || May 25 || Astros || 2–11 || Smith (2–1)  || Miller (1–3) || — || 29,431 || 24–25 ||L2
|- style="background:#bfb;"
| 50 || May 26 || Astros || 8–6 || Carrasco (6–3) || McCullers Jr. (6–3)  || Allen (8) || 30,639 || 25–25 ||W1
|- style="background:#bfb;"
| 51 || May 27 || Astros || 10–9 (14) || Otero (1–1) || Peacock (1–2) || — || 27,765 || 26–25 ||W2
|- style="background:#bfb;"
| 52 || May 28 || White Sox || 9–6 || Plutko (3–0) || Volstad (0–3) || — || 23,729 || 27–25 ||W3
|- style="background:#bfb;"
| 53 || May 29 || White Sox || 7–3 || Clevinger (4–2) || Giolito (3–6) || — || 30,441 || 28–25 ||W4
|- style="background:#bfb;"
| 54 || May 30 || White Sox || 9–1 || Kluber (8–2) || López (1–4) || — || 17,930 || 29–25 ||W5
|- style="background:#bfb;"
| 55 || May 31 || @ Twins || 9–8 || Olson (1–1) || Reed (1–4) || Allen (9) || 19,148 || 30–25 ||W6
|-

|- style="background:#fbb;"
| 56 || June 1 || @ Twins || 4–7 || Berríos (6–5)  || Carrasco (6–4) || Rodney (12) || 30,171 || 30-26 ||L1
|- style="background:#fbb;"
| 57 || June 2 || @ Twins || 1–7 || Lynn (4–4) || Bauer (4–4) || — || 23,476 || 30-27 ||L2
|- style="background:#fbb;"
| 58 || June 3 || @ Twins || 5–7 || Rodney (2–2) || Allen (2–2) || — || 26,096 || 30-28 ||L3
|- style="background:#bfb;"
| 59 || June 5 || Brewers || 3–2 || Kluber (9–2) || Guerra (3–4) || Allen (10) || 22,330 || 31-28 ||W1
|- style="background:#bfb;"
| 60 || June 6 || Brewers || 3–1 || Carrasco (7–4) || Anderson (4–5) || Allen (11) || 21,315 || 32-28 ||W2
|- style="background:#bfb;"
| 61 || June 8 || @ Tigers || 4–1 || Bauer (5–4) || Greene (2–3) || Allen (12) || 21,766 || 33-28 ||W3
|- style="background:#fbb;"
| 62 || June 9 || @ Tigers || 2–4 (12)|| Saupold (4–1) || Allen (2–3) || — || 27,038  || 33-29 ||L1
|- style="background:#bfb;"
| 63 || June 10 || @ Tigers || 9–2 || Kluber (10–2) || Lewicki (0–2) || — || 22,862 || 34-29 ||W1
|- style="background:#bfb;"
| 64 || June 11 || @ White Sox || 4–0 || Carrasco (8–4) || Giolito (4–7) || — || 13,125 || 35-29 ||W2
|- style="background:#fbb;"
| 65 || June 12 || @ White Sox || 1–5 || Shields (2–7) || Plutko (3–1) || Soria (9) || 12,357 || 35-30 ||L1
|- style="background:#fbb;"
| 66 || June 13 || @ White Sox || 2–3 || Covey (3–1) || Bauer (5–5) || Soria (10) || 19,390 || 35-31 ||L2
|- style="background:#bfb;
| 67 || June 14 || @ White Sox || 5–2 || Clevinger (5–2) || Volstad (1–4) || Allen (13) || 17,183 || 36-31 ||W1
|- style="background:#fbb;"
| 68 || June 15 || Twins || 3–6 || Gibson (2–4) || Kluber (10–3) || Rodney (13) || 32,637 || 36-32 ||L1
|- style="background:#fbb;"
| 69 || June 16 || Twins || 3–9 || Magill (2–1) || Carrasco (8–5) || — || 30,282 || 36-33 ||L2
|- style="background:#bfb;"
| 70 || June 17 || Twins || 4–1 || Bieber (1–0) || Odorizzi (3–4) || Allen (14) || 27,128 || 37-33 ||W1
|- style="background:#bfb;"
| 71 || June 18 || White Sox || 6–2 || Bauer (6–5) || Covey (3–2) || — || 17,271 || 38-33 ||W2
|- style="background:#bfb;"
| 72 || June 19 || White Sox || 6–3 || Clevinger (6–2) || Rodon (0–2) || Allen (15) || 20,394 || 39-33 ||W3
|- style="background:#bfb;"
| 73 || June 20 || White Sox || 12–0 || Kluber (11–3) || Lopez (2–5) || — || 23,101 || 40-33 ||W4
|- style="background:#bfb;"
| 74 || June 22 || Tigers || 10–0 || Bieber (2–0) || Fiers (5–4) || — || 30,926 || 41-33 ||W5
|- style="background:#bfb;"
| 75 || June 23 || Tigers || 4–1 || Bauer (7–5) || Liriano (3–3) || Allen (16) || 34,435 || 42–33 ||W6
|- style="background:#bfb;"
| 76 || June 24 || Tigers || 12–2 || Plutko (4–1) || Boyd (4–6) || — || 31,208 || 43-33 ||W7
|- style="background:#fbb;"
| 77 || June 25 || @ Cardinals || 0–4 || Gant (2–2) || Clevinger (6–3) || Norris (15) || 42,007 || 43–34 ||L1
|- style="background:#fbb;"
| 78 || June 26 || @ Cardinals || 2–11 || Martinez (4–4) || Kluber (11–4) || — || 40,288 || 43–35 ||L2
|- style="background:#bfb;"
| 79 || June 27 || @ Cardinals || 5–1 || Bieber (3–0) || Flaherty (3–3) || — || 43,598 || 44–35 ||W1
|- style="background:#fbb;"
| 80 || June 29 || @ Athletics || 1–3 || Blackburn (2–2) || Bauer (7–6) || Trienen (21) || 14,823 || 44–36 ||L1
|- style="background:#fbb;"
| 81 || June 30 || @ Athletics || 2–7 || Jackson (1–0) ||Plutko (4–2)|| Trivino (3)|| 17,748 || 44–37 ||L2
|-

|- style="background:#bfb;"
| 82 || July 1 || @ Athletics || 15–3 || Clevinger (7–3) || Montas (4–2) || — || 16,164 || 45–37 ||W1
|- style="background:#bfb;"
| 83 || July 2 || @ Royals || 9–3 || Kluber (12–4) || Junis (5–10) || — || 18,285 || 46–37 ||W2
|- style="background:#bfb;"
| 84 || July 3 || @ Royals || 6–4 || Bieber (4–0) || Duffy (4–8) || Allen (17) || 19,005 || 47–37 ||W3
|- style="background:#bfb;"
| 85 || July 4 || @ Royals || 3–2 || Bauer (8–6) || Oaks (0–2) || Allen (18) || 22,001 || 48–37 ||W4
|- style="background:#bfb;"
| 86 || July 6 || Athletics || 10–4 || Carrasco (9–5) || Blackburn (2–3) || — || 34,633 || 49–37 ||W5
|- style="background:#fbb;"
| 87 || July 7 || Athletics || 3–6 (11)|| Trienen (5–1) || Tomlin (0–5) || — || 33,195 || 49–38 ||L1
|- style="background:#fbb;"
| 88 || July 8 || Athletics || 0–6 || Anderson (1–2) || Bieber (4–1) || — || 27,125 || 49–39 ||L2
|- style="background:#fbb;"
| 89 || July 9 || Reds || 5–7 || DeSclafani (4–1) || Clevinger (7–4) || Iglesias (18) || 22,561 || 49–40 ||L3
|- style="background:#fbb;"
| 90 || July 10 || Reds || 4–7 || Crockett (1–0) || Allen (2–4) || Iglesias (19) || 21,908 || 49–41 ||L4
|- style="background:#bfb;"
| 91 || July 11 || Reds || 19–4 || Carrasco (10–5) || Mahle (7–7) || Plutko (1) || 22,215 || 50–41 ||W1
|- style="background:#fbb;"
| 92 || July 12 || Yankees || 4–7 || Robertson (6–3) || Kluber (12–5)  || Chapman (25) || 31,267 || 50–42 ||L1
|- style="background:#bfb;"
| 93 || July 13 || Yankees || 6–5 || Bieber (5–1) || German (2–5) || Allen (19) || 35,078 || 51–42 ||W1
|- style="background:#fbb;"
| 94 || July 14 || Yankees || 4–5 || Robertson (7–3) || Clevinger (7–5) || Chapman (26) || 35,353 || 51–43 ||L1
|- style="background:#bfb;"
| 95 || July 15 || Yankees || 5–2 || Carrasco (11–5) || Green (5–2) || Allen (20) || 32,664 || 52–43 || W1
|- style="text-align:center; background:#bbcaff;"
| colspan="10" | 89th All-Star Game
|- style="background:#bfb;"
| 96 || July 20 || @ Rangers || 9–8 (11) ||McAllister (1–2) ||Moore (1–6) ||Otero (1) || 28,253 || 53–43 || W2
|- style="background:#bfb;"
| 97 || July 21 || @ Rangers || 16–3 ||Carrasco (12–5) || Colón (5–8) || — || 31,532 || 54-43 || W3
|- style="background:#fbb;"
| 98 || July 22 || @ Rangers || 0–5 || Gallardo (4–1) ||Clevinger (7–6) || — || 21,829 || 54–44 || L1
|- style="background:#fbb;"
| 99 || July 23 || Pirates || 0–7 (6) || Williams (8–7) || Kluber (12–6) || — || 24,925 || 54–45 ||L2
|- style="background:#fbb;"
| 100 || July 24 || Pirates || 4–9 || Musgrove (4–4) || Bieber (5–2) || — || 26,414 || 54–46 ||L3
|- style="background:#bfb;"
| 101 || July 25 || Pirates || 4–0 || Bauer (9–6) || Taillon (7–8) || Hand (25) || 31,682 || 55–46 ||W1
|- style="background:#bfb;"
| 102 || July 27 || @ Tigers || 8–3 || Allen (3–4) || Jimenez (4–2) || — || 26,962 || 56–46 ||W2
|- style="background:#fbb;"
| 103 || July 28 || @ Tigers || 1–2 || Hardy (4–3) ||  Clevinger (7–7) || Greene (21) || 29,097 || 56–47 ||L1
|- style="background:#bfb;"
| 104 || July 29 || @ Tigers || 8–1 || Kluber (13–6) || Zimmermann (4–3) || — || 26,498 || 57–47 ||W1
|- style="background:#fbb;"
| 105 || July 30 || @ Twins || 4–5 || Rodney (3–2) || Ramirez (0–1) || —  || 26,256 || 57–48 ||L1
|- style="background:#bfb;"
| 106 || July 31 || @ Twins || 6–2 || Bauer (10–6) || Gibson (5–8) || Allen (21) || 25,407 || 58–48 ||W1
|-

|- style="background:#bfb;"
| 107 || August 1 || @ Twins || 2–0 || Carrasco (13–5) || Magill (2–2) || Hand (26) || 29,261 || 59–48 ||W2
|- style="background:#fbb;"
| 108 || August 3 || Angels || 4–7 || Anderson (3–2) || Pérez (0–1) || — || 35,242 || 59–49 ||L1
|- style="background:#bfb;"
| 109 || August 4 || Angels || 3–0 || Kluber (14–6) || Pena (1–3) || — || 34,814 || 60–49 ||W1
|- style="background:#bfb;"
| 110 || August 5 || Angels || 4–3 || Bieber (6–2) || McGuire (0–2) || Hand (27) || 28,993 || 61–49 ||W2
|- style="background:#bfb;"
| 111 || August 6 || Twins || 10–0 || Bauer (11–6) || Gibson (5–9) || — || 18,620 || 62–49 ||W3
|- style="background:#fbb;"
| 112 || August 7 || Twins || 2–3 || Mejia (2–0) || Carrasco (13–6) || Rodney (25) || 19,921 || 62–50 ||L1
|- style="background:#bfb;"
| 113 || August 8 || Twins || 5–2 || Allen (4–4) || Hildenberger (2-3) || — || 25,476 || 63–50 ||W1
|- style="background:#bfb;"
| 114 || August 9 || Twins || 5–4 || Miller (2–3) || Reed (1-6) || — || 25,942 || 64–50 ||W2
|- style="background:#fbb;"
| 115 || August 10 || @ White Sox || 0–1 || Fry (1–2) || Ramirez (0–2) || — || 18,772 || 64–51 ||L1
|- style="background:#bfb;"
| 116 || August 11 || @ White Sox || 3–1 || Bauer (12–6) || Shields (4–14) || Allen (22) || 28,061 || 65–51 ||W1
|- style="background:#bfb;"
| 117 || August 12 || @ White Sox || 9–7 || Carrasco (14–6) || Covey (4–9) || Allen (23) || 23,853 || 66–51 ||W2
|- style="background:#bfb;"
| 118 || August 13 || @ Reds || 10–3 || Clevinger (8–7) || Bailey (1v10) || — || 20,607 || 67–51 ||W3
|- style="background:#bfb;"
| 119 || August 14 || @ Reds || 8–1 || Kluber (15–6) || Romano (7–10) || — || 19,034 || 68–51 ||W4
|- style="background:#bfb;"
| 120 || August 15 || @ Reds || 4–3 || Otero (2–1) || Reed (0–1) || Hand (28) || 17,275 || 69–51 ||W5
|- style="background:#bfb;"
| 121 || August 17 || Orioles || 2–1 || Carrasco (15–6) || Hess (2–7) || Allen (24) || 28,264 || 70–51 ||W6
|- style="background:#fbb;"
| 122 || August 18 || Orioles || 2–4 || Cobb (4–15) || Plutko (4–3) || — || 35,007 || 70–52 ||L1
|- style="background:#bfb;"
| 123 || August 19 || Orioles || 8–0 || Clevinger (9–7) || Ramirez (1–5) || — || 30,555 || 71–52 ||W1
|- style="background:#bfb;"
| 124 || August 20 || @ Red Sox || 5–4 || Kluber (16–6) || Porcello (15–6) || Allen (25) || 37,274 || 72–52 ||W2
|- style="background:#bfb;"
| 125 || August 21 || @ Red Sox || 6–3 || Bieber (7–2) || Eovaldi (5–5) || Hand (29) || 37,188 || 73–52 ||W3
|- style="background:#fbb;"
| 126 || August 22 || @ Red Sox || 4–10 || Barnes (5–3) || Carrasco (15–7) || — || 37,107 || 73–53 ||L1
|- style="background:#fbb;"
| 127 || August 23 || @ Red Sox || 0–7 || Price (14–6) || Plutko (4–4) || — || 37,396 || 73–54 ||L2
|- style="background:#fbb;"
| 128 || August 24 || @ Royals || 4–5 || Peralta (1–0) || Allen (4–5) || — || 19,304 || 73–55 ||L3
|- style="background:#fbb;"
| 129 || August 25 || @ Royals || 1–7 || Fillmyer (2–1) || Kluber (16–7) || — || 16,894 || 73–56 ||L4
|- style="background:#bfb;"
| 130 || August 26 || @ Royals || 12–5 || Bieber (8–2) || López (0–4) || — || 18,575 || 74–56 ||W1
|- style="background:#bfb;"
| 131 || August 28 || Twins || 8–1 || Carrasco (16–7) || Gibson (7–11) || — || 19,194 || 75–56 ||W2
|- style="background:#fbb;"
| 132 || August 29 || Twins || 3–4 || May (3–0) || Allen (4–6) || Hildenberger (5) || 20,398 || 75–57 ||L1
|- style="background:#bfb;"
| 133 || August 30 || Twins || 5–3 || Clevinger (10–7) || Odorizzi (5–9) || Hand (30) || 20,244 || 76–57 ||W1
|- style="background:#bfb;"
| 134 || August 31 || Rays || 3–0 || Kluber (17–7) || Glasnow (1–4) || Hand (31) || 25,639 || 77–57 ||W1
|-

|- style="background:#fbb;"
| 135 || September 1 || Rays || 3–5 || Snell (17–5) || Bieber (8–3) || Kolarek (2) || 31,816 || 77–58 ||L1
|- style="background:#fbb;"
| 136 || September 2 || Rays || 4–6 || Yarbrough (13–5) || Carrasco (16–8) || Alvarado (7) || 26,535 || 77–59 ||L2
|- style="background:#fbb;"
| 137 || September 3 || Royals || 1–5 || Junis (8–12) || Plutko (4–5) || Hill (2) || 20,536 || 77–60 ||L3
|- style="background:#bfb;"
| 138 || September 4 || Royals || 9–3 || Clevinger (11–7) || Duffy (8–12) || — || 17,041 || 78–60 ||W1
|- style="background:#bfb;"
| 139 || September 5 || Royals || 3–1 || Kluber (18–7) || Keller (7–6) || Hand (32) || 18,435 || 79–60 ||W2
|- style="background:#bfb;"
| 140 || September 6 || @ Blue Jays || 9–4 || Bieber (9–3) || Gaviglio (3–8) || — || 20,618 || 80–60 ||W3
|- style="background:#fbb;"
| 141 || September 7 || @ Blue Jays || 2–3 (11)|| Barnes (3–2) || Cimber (3–6) || — || 26,830 || 80–61 ||L1
|- style="background:#bfb;"
| 142 || September 8 || @ Blue Jays || 9–8 || Tomlin (1–5) || Reid-Foley (1–3) || Allen (26) || 35,353 || 81–61 ||W1
|- style="background:#fbb;"
| 143 || September 9 || @ Blue Jays || 2–6 || Pannone (2–1) || Clevinger (11–8) || Giles (20) || 31,184 || 81–62 ||L1
|- style="background:#fbb;"
| 144 || September 10 || @ Rays || 5–6 || Schultz (2–0) || Hand (2–5) || — || 12,724 || 81–63 ||L2
|- style="background:#bfb;"
| 145 || September 11 || @ Rays || 2-0 || Bieber (10–3) || Glasnow (1–6) || Allen (27) || 10,599 || 82–63 ||W1
|- style="background:#fbb;"
| 146 || September 12 || @ Rays || 1–3 || Snell (19–5) || Carrasco (16–9) || Alvarado (8) || 10,654 || 82–64 ||L1
|- style="background:#fbb;"
| 147 || September 14 || Tigers || 4–5 || VerHagen (3–2) || Cimber (3–7) || Greene (29) || 26,952 || 82–65 ||L2
|- style="background:#bfb;"
| 148 || September 15 || Tigers || 15–0 || Clevinger (12–8) || Fulmer (3–12) || — || 26,532 || 83–65 ||W1
|- style="background:#fbb;"
| 149 || September 16 || Tigers || 4–6 || Liriano (5–10) || Bieber (10–4) || Greene (30) || 24,862 || 83–66 ||L1
|- style="background:#bfb;"
| 150 || September 18 || White Sox || 5–3 || Kluber (19–7) || Rodon (6–6) || Miller (2) || 19,277 || 84–66 ||W1
|- style="background:#bfb;"
| 151 || September 19 || White Sox || 4–1 || Pérez (1–1) || Frare (0–1) || — || 18,263 || 85–66 ||W2
|- style="background:#fbb;"
| 152 || September 20 || White Sox || 4–5 (11) || Santiago (6–3) || Cimber (3–8) || — || 19,457 || 85–67 ||L1
|- style="background:#fbb;"
| 153 || September 21 || Red Sox || 5–7 || Barnes (6–3) || Bieber (10–5)  || Kimbrel (42) || 27,892 || 85–68 ||L2
|- style="background:#bfb;"
| 154 || September 22 || Red Sox || 5–4 (11) || Olson (2–1) || Pomeranz (2–6) || — || 35,095 || 86–68 ||W1
|- style="background:#bfb;"
| 155 || September 23 || Red Sox || 4–3 (11) || Tomlin (2–5) || Cuevas (0–2) || — || 27,879 || 87–68 ||W2
|- style="background:#bfb;"
| 156 || September 24 || @ White Sox || 4–0 || Kluber (20–7) || Hamilton (0–2) || — || 18,217 || 88–68 ||W3
|- style="background:#fbb;"
| 157 || September 25 || @ White Sox || 4–5 || Hamilton (1–2) || Carrasco (16–10) || — || 17,040 || 88–69 ||L1
|- style="background:#bfb;"
| 158 || September 26 || @ White Sox || 10–2 || Bieber (11–5) || Fry (2–3) || — || 25,598 || 89–69 ||W1
|- style="background:#fbb;"
| 159 || September 27 || @ Royals || 1–2 (10)|| Hammel (4–14) || Ramírez (0–3) || — || 19,262 || 89–70 ||L1
|- style="background:#bfb;"
| 160 || September 28 || @ Royals || 14–6 || Clevinger (13–8)  || Kennedy (3–9) || — || 15,920 || 90–70 || W1
|- style="background:#fbb;"
| 161 || September 29 || @ Royals || 4–9 || Junis (9–12) || Miller (2–4) || — || 23,324 || 90–71 ||L1
|- style="background:#bfb;"
| 162 || September 30 || @ Royals || 2–1 || Carrasco (17–10) || Skoglund (1–6) || Bauer (1) || 19,690 || 91– 71 ||W1
|-

|- style="text-align:center;"
| Legend:       = Win       = Loss       = PostponementBold = Indians team member

Postseason

Game log

|-style="background:#fbb
| 1 || October 5 || @ Astros || 2–7 || Verlander (1-0) || Kluber (0-1) || - || 43,514 || 0–1 
|-style="background:#fbb
| 2 || October 6 || @ Astros || 1–3 || Cole (1-0) || Carrasco (0-1)  || Osuna (1) || 43,520 || 0–2
|-style="background:#fbb
| 3 || October 8 || Astros || 3–11 || McHugh (1-0) || Bauer (1-0) || - || 37,252 || 0–3
|-

|- style="text-align:center;"
| Legend:       = Win       = Loss       = PostponementBold = Indians team member

Postseason rosters

| style="text-align:left" |
Pitchers: 24 Andrew Miller 28 Corey Kluber 33 Brad Hand 37 Cody Allen 39 Óliver Pérez 47 Trevor Bauer 52 Mike Clevinger 57 Shane Bieber 59 Carlos Carrasco 61 Dan Otero 90 Adam Cimber
Catchers: 7 Yan Gomes 55 Roberto Pérez
Infielders: 11 José Ramírez 12 Francisco Lindor 17 Yonder Alonso 27 Josh Donaldson 36 Yandy Díaz
Outfielders: 1 Greg Allen 6 Brandon Guyer 22 Jason Kipnis 23 Michael Brantley 26 Rajai Davis 53 Melky Cabrera 
Designated hitters: 10 Edwin Encarnación 
|- valign="top"

Player stats

Note: Team batting and pitching leaders in each category are in bold.

Batting
Note: G = Games played; AB = At bats; R = Runs scored; H = Hits; 2B = Doubles; 3B = Triples; HR = Home runs; RBI = Runs batted in; AVG = Batting average; SB = Stolen bases

Pitching
Note: W = Wins; L = Losses; ERA = Earned run average; G = Games pitched; GS = Games started; SV = Saves; IP = Innings pitched; H = Hits allowed; R = Total runs allowed; ER = Earned runs allowed; BB = Walks allowed; K = Strikeouts

Farm system

See also
 List of Cleveland Indians team records

References

External links
Cleveland Indians 2018 Schedule at MLB.com
2018 Cleveland Indians season at Baseball Reference

Cleveland Guardians seasons
Cleveland
Cleveland Indians
American League Central champion seasons